Ilsey Anna Juber (born April 17, 1986) is an American singer and songwriter from California. Juber co-wrote Mark Ronson's "Nothing Breaks Like a Heart" feat. Miley Cyrus, along with much of  Ronson’s Late Night Feelings album with vocals featured on the track "Spinning". In 2020, she worked on "Midnight Sky" as well as two other songs from Cyrus' album, Plastic Hearts. On October 3, "Midnight Sky" hit #11 on Billboard's Adult Top 40. Cyrus performed her song live at the 2020 MTV Video Music Awards. Additionally, Juber co-wrote "All Night" by Beyoncé, and Panic! at the Disco's "High Hopes", which reached #1 on the US Hot AC, Alternative, and Top 40 radio charts. She was also a co-writer on the 2015 single "Powerful" by Major Lazer featuring Ellie Goulding. In 2018, Juber won two BMI awards for her work co-writing "Mercy" by Shawn Mendes and "In the Name of Love" by Martin Garrix and Bebe Rexha. Later in 2020, Juber wrote "This Is Us" for Jimmie Allen and Noah Cyrus, who performed their duet at the 2020 CMT Music Awards.  Other notable writing credits include "She Loves Control" by Camila Cabello, "Ocean" by Martin Garrix featuring Khalid, Rita Ora's "Let You Love Me", Robin Schulz's "Headlights", "Disarm You" for Kaskade (both of which she also provided vocal features), and the entire Lykke Li album so sad so sexy. She is presently signed to Sony/ATV Music Publishing. She provides vocals on the track "Soldier" from Stanley Clarke's 2011 Grammy for Best Contemporary Jazz Album, The Stanley Clarke Band.

Family
Juber is the daughter of Hope and Laurence Juber, and sister to Nico Juber. Her father was the lead guitarist for the band Paul McCartney and Wings from 1978 to 1981, and is now a distinguished solo fingerstyle guitarist. Juber’s maternal grandfather was Sherwood Schwartz, the American television producer behind Gilligan’s Island and The Brady Bunch.

Discography

Songwriting credits
 indicates a background vocal contribution.

 indicates an un-credited lead vocal contribution.

 indicates a credited vocal/featured artist contribution.

References

External links
Official website

1986 births
21st-century American composers
American women singer-songwriters
Living people
Singers from Los Angeles
21st-century American women musicians
21st-century American singers
21st-century American women singers
21st-century women composers
Singer-songwriters from California